Conothraupis is a genus of South American birds in the tanager family Thraupidae.

Taxonomy and species list
The genus Conothraupis  was introduced in 1880 by the English zoologist Philip Sclater to accommodate the black-and-white tanager. The name combines the Latin conos meaning "cone" with the Ancient Greek thraupis, an unknown small bird which in ornithology is used to indicate a tanager. The genus is a member of the  subfamily Tachyphoninae within the family Thraupidae and contains two species.

References

 
Bird genera
Taxa named by Philip Sclater